The Ekron Royal Dedicatory Inscription, or simply the Ekron inscription, is a royal dedication inscription found in its primary context in the ruins of a temple during the 1996 excavations of Ekron. It is known as KAI 286.

It is incised on a rectangular-shaped limestone block, has five lines and 71 characters, and mentions Ekron, thus confirming the identification of the site, as well as five of its rulers, including Ikausu (Achish), son of Padi, who built the sanctuary. Padi and Ikausu are known as kings of Ekron from the late 8th- and 7th-century Neo-Assyrian Royal Annals. King Padi is mentioned in connection to events from the years 701 and 699 BC, King Ikausu in relation to 673 and 667 BC, placing the date of the inscription firmly in the first half of the 7th century BC, and most likely in the second quarter of that century.

It is the first connected body of text to be identified as "Philistine", on the basis of Ekron's identification as a Philistine city in the Bible (see  and ). However, it is written in a Canaanite dialect similar to Phoenician and Old Byblian, such that its discoverers referred to it as "something of an enigma".

Discovery
The inscription was discovered in the Albright Institute of Archaeological Research Tel Miqne excavations of Ekron led by Seymour Gitin and Trude Dothan.

The inscription is one of the primary documents for establishing the chronology of events relating to the end of the late biblical period, especially a possible late history of the Philistines. The inscription has therefore been referred to as one of the most important archaeological finds of the 20th century in Israel.

Translation
The text is written from right-to-left in the style and dialect of Phoenician inscriptions from Byblos. It has been transcribed and translated as:

𐤟𐤁𐤕𐤟𐤁𐤍𐤟𐤀𐤊𐤉𐤔𐤟𐤁𐤍𐤟𐤐𐤃𐤉𐤟𐤁𐤍
bt·bn·ʾkyš·bn·pdy·bn·
The temple (which) he built, Achish son of Padi, son of

𐤉𐤎𐤃𐤟𐤁𐤍𐤟𐤀𐤃𐤀𐤟𐤁𐤍𐤟𐤉𐤏𐤓𐤟𐤔𐤓𐤏𐤒
ysd·bn·ʾdʾ·bn·yʿr·śrʿq
Yasid, son of Ada, son of Ya'ir, ruler of Ek-

𐤓𐤍𐤟𐤋𐤐𐤕[ ]𐤉𐤄𐤟𐤀𐤃𐤕𐤄𐤟𐤕𐤁𐤓𐤊𐤄𐤟𐤅𐤕
rn·lpt[ ]yh·ʾdth·tbrkh·wt
ron, for Pt[ ]yh his lady, may she bless him, and

𐤟𐤔𐤌⸢𐤓⸣𐤄𐤟𐤅𐤕𐤀𐤓𐤊𐤟𐤉𐤌𐤄𐤟𐤅𐤕𐤁𐤓𐤊
šm⸢r⸣h·wtʾrk·ymh·wtbrk·
protect him, and prolong his days, and bless

𐤀⸣𐤓⸢𐤑⸣𐤄⸣
⸢ʾ⸣r⸢ṣ⸣h
his land

Interpretation
The language and form of writing of the Ekron inscription show a significant Phoenician influence, and the name ʾ-k-y-š is understood as Achish.

The inscription contains a list of five of the kings of Ekron, fathers to sons: Ya'ir, Ada, Yasid, Padi, and Achish, and the name of the goddess Pt[ ]yh to whom the temple is dedicated. Padi and Achish (as "Ikausu") are mentioned in the Neo-Assyrian Royal Annals, which provide the basis for dating their reigns to the late 8th and 7th centuries BCE.

The inscription also securely identified the site by mentioning the name Ekron.

The identity of "pt[g/r/-]yh" has been subject to scholarly debate, with the third letter being either a very small gimel giving "ptgyh" which could be a previously unknown deity, or a resh giving ptryh or "Pidray" the Semitic daughter of Baal, or a nun giving "ptnyh", or no letter at all giving "ptyh".

Other inscriptions from Ekron
The excavations also produced 16 short inscriptions including kdš l’šrt (“dedicated to [the goddess] Asherat”), lmqm (“for the shrine”), and the letter tet with three horizontal lines below it (probably indicating 30 units of produce set aside for tithing), and silver hoards.

References

Further reading
 S. Gitin, T. Dothan, and J. Naveh, "A Royal Dedicatory Inscription from Ekron," Israel Exploration Journal 47 (1997): 1-18
 M. Görge (1998), “Die Göttin der Ekron-Inschrift,” BN 93, 9–10.
 Demsky, Aaron.  "The Name of the Goddess of Ekron: A New Reading," Journal of the Ancient Near Eastern Society vol. 25 (1997) pp. 1–5
M.W. Meehl, T. Dothan and S. Gitin, Tel Miqne-Ekron Excavations, 1995–1996, Field INE, East Slope: Iron Age I (Early Philistine Period), Final Field Reports 8, 2006
S.M. Ortiz, S. Gitin and T. Dothan, Tel Miqne-Ekron Excavations, 1994–1996, Fields IVNE/NW (Upper) and VSE/SW: The Iron Age /I Late Philistine Temple Complex 650, Final Field Reports 9, 2006
Philistine dedicatory inscription, at the Israel Museum
 The Ekron Inscription of Akhayus (2.42)
 Gitin, Seymour (1999), Ekron of the Philistines in the Late Iron Age II, ASOR
 Berlant, Stephen (2008), "The Mysterious Ekron Goddess Revisited," Journal of The Ancient Near Eastern Society'' vol. 31 pp. 15–21 

7th-century BC inscriptions
1996 archaeological discoveries
Ancient Israel and Judah
Ancient Near East steles
Archaeological artifacts
Philistines
Philistine inscriptions
KAI inscriptions
Ekron